The 1989 NCAA Women's Golf Championships were contested at the eighth annual NCAA-sanctioned golf tournament to determine the individual and team national champions of women's collegiate golf in the United States. Until 1996, the NCAA would hold just one annual women's golf championship for all programs across Division I, Division II, and Division III.

The tournament was held at the Stanford Golf Course in Stanford, California.

San Jose State won the team championship, the Spartans' second.

Future LPGA Major champion Pat Hurst, from San Jose State, won the individual title.

Individual results

Individual champion
 Pat Hurst, San José State (292, E)

Team results

 Debut appearance

References

NCAA Women's Golf Championship
Golf in California
NCAA Women's Golf Championship
NCAA Women's Golf Championship
NCAA Women's Golf Championship